Maria Geertruida Barbiers (25 January 1801 – 30 January 1879) was a 19th-century painter from the Northern Netherlands. She was born in Haarlem as the daughter of Pieter Barbiers III and Maria Geertruida Snabilie. Her brother Pieter Barbiers IV and sister Caecilia Geertruida also became painters. In 1823 she married the painter Pieter de Goeje. She is known for flower still lifes, and often signed her works ''M.G. de Goeje Barbiers’'.	
She died in Haarlem.

References

External links
Maria Geertruida Barbiers on Artnet	
	

1801 births
1879 deaths
19th-century Dutch painters
Artists from Haarlem
Dutch women painters
19th-century Dutch women artists